Marc Buckland is an American television director and producer.

Filmography 
Stumptown (2019–20) - Director
Santa Clarita Diet (2017–19) - Director
Powerless (2017) - Director
Dream Team (2016) - Director
The Millers (2015) - Director
Sean Saves the World (2013–14) - Director, executive producer
The Gates (2013) - Director
Next Caller (2012) - Director, executive producer
Bent (2012) - Director
Grimm (2011) - Director, executive producer
Love Bites (2011) - Director, executive producer
My Name Is Earl (2005–2007) - Director, executive producer
Ed (2000–2004) - Director, executive producer
The Jake Effect (2002) - Director, executive producer
Scrubs (2001–2003) - Director
Sports Night (1999) - Director
The West Wing (1999) - Director
Felicity (1998) - Director
Murder One (1997) - Director

References

External links

American television directors
American television producers
Primetime Emmy Award winners
Living people
Place of birth missing (living people)
Year of birth missing (living people)
Directors Guild of America Award winners